Anarchism: A Theoretical Analysis is a 1981 book about anarchism as a political theory written by Alan Ritter.

Further reading 

 
 
 
 
 
 
 

1981 non-fiction books
Books about anarchism
Cambridge University Press books
English-language books